Scopula libyssa is a moth of the family Geometridae. It is found in Africa.

The larvae feed on Oxyanthus monteiroi, Oxyanthus speciosus and Randia axillare.

Subspecies
Scopula libyssa libyssa (Mozambique, South Africa, Uganda)
Scopula libyssa ethelinda (Kirby, 1896) (Kenya, Malawi, Tanzania)
Scopula libyssa monteironis (Druce, 1883)
Scopula libyssa natalensis (Prout, 1917) (South Africa)

References

Moths described in 1858
libyssa
Moths of Sub-Saharan Africa